Ad colligenda bona is a Latin phrase that approximately translates as "to collect the goods".  In cases involving something quid pro quo, a prosecutor may be eligible for certain goods. Or, if specific items i.e. estate are unclaimable, the state would collect their goods.

In English law, a grant ad colligenda bona is sometimes applied for by parties interested in the administration of a deceased person's estate. The grant is useful where it has not been possible to grant probate in solemn form; for example, because there is a dispute over the validity of the will. Unlike an ordinary executor or administrator, someone with a grant ad colligenda cannot make any distribution of the estate's assets. Their role is to protect the assets of the estate while the dispute surrounding the will is resolved.

References 

Latin legal terminology